Jijiga (Jijiga) is the capital city of Somali Region, Ethiopia. It became the capital of the Somali Region in 1995 after it was moved from Gode. Located in the Fafan Zone with 70 km (37 mi) west of the border with Somalia, the city has an elevation of 1,634 metres above sea level. Jigjiga is traditionally the seat of the Bartire Garad Wiil-Waal of the Jidwaaq Absame. The International airport is named after him. 
The clan those there City and how they be the first one

1 jidwaaq 

2 gari koombe 

3 ogaadeen 

4 others

History

The region around Jijiga is believed to be associated with the ancient Gidaya state which existed as early as thirteenth century. Jijiga was mentioned by W.C. Barker in 1842 as one of the mahalla or halting-places of the caravan route between Zeila and Harar.

One of the earliest detailed references to Jijiga comes from British hunter Colonel Swayne, who passed through Jijiga in February 1893, which he described as a stockaded fort with a garrison of 25 men next to a group of wells.
According to I. M. Lewis, the Dervish invaded Jijiga in March 1900. Although the Dervishes suffered heavy losses, which allowed the Ethiopian authorities to declare a victory, Sayyid Mohammed's men recovered livestock that the Ethiopians had taken from the Somalis and proved that his was a force to be reckoned with. 

However, Richard Pankhurst states that Jijiga was founded in 1916 by Fitawrari Tekle Hawariat Tekle Mariyam, who had the town methodically organized in a square grid of streets, built a fort, dug several wells, encouraged agriculture, and set a fixed land tax. Actions which won the hearts of the Ogaden Somalis and transformed Jigjiga from a garrison town to a modern urban centre.

During the Second Italo-Ethiopian War, Jijiga served for some time as Dejazmach Nasibu Emmanual's headquarters and a supply center for the Ethiopian army. An Italian force under Colonel Navarra occupied the city on the evening of 5 May 1936. Two days later, while inspecting a ruined Ethiopian Orthodox church in the city, Marshal Rodolfo Graziani fell into a concealed hole, which he was afterwards convinced was a mantrap; Anthony Mockler suggests this mishap contributed to his murderously paranoid mindset which led to the atrocities that followed the attempt on Graziani's life 19 February 1937.

British
On 17 March 1941, during the East African Campaign of World War II, Jijiga was occupied by the 23rd Nigerian Brigade of the British 1st African Division. This was after the Italian garrison had already abandoned the city.

Once they had possession of Jijiga, however, the British were slow in returning the city to the Ethiopians. At first, it was included as part of The Reserved Area, as defined in the Anglo-Ethiopian Agreement of 31 January 1942, which also included much of the Haud. Only after patient pressure from Emperor Haile Selassie did the two countries begin to discuss an agreement for the evacuation of the British from this territory in 1948. Although Ethiopian officers began to take over the administration from British officers in May–July, the protocol agreeing to the transfer was not signed until 24 July of that year. A brief demonstration of overt Somali nationalism occurred in Jijiga when the Somali Youth League (SYL) raised their flag before their headquarters in defiance of the law and the new Ethiopian administrators. Major Demeka, the governor-designate of the Ogaden Province, requested the British military administration, which was still in charge, to remove the flag. When the leaders refused to pull down their flag, the police brought it down with a machine gun mounted on an armored car. In the disturbances that followed, one policeman was killed and another wounded while the police opened fire on the crowd and killed 25 of them. The SYL was proscribed shortly afterward in Ethiopia.

Handover
Germame Neway, one of the leaders of the unsuccessful 1960 coup, served as governor over Jijiga in 1959. He had been transferred there for his civic responsibility and concern for the underprivileged while administering a district in Sidamo Province. The obstruction he encountered, not only in Sidamo but in Jijiga, convinced him of the need for radical measures. In the early stage of the Ethiopian Revolution individual units from the Third Division put the local governor under house arrest around 13 April 1974. During the Ogaden War, Jijiga experienced the Battle of Jijiga and was occupied by the Western Somali Liberation Front's Ahmad ibn Ibrihim al-Ghazi division led by Col. Yusuf Dheere, later with the Somali National Army, from September 1977 until February/March 1978.

The Regional government held a conference in this city to promote peace and development between 10 and 13 March 1996, which was attended by 535 from the local woredas, as well as the Deputy Prime Minister and Defense Minister of Ethiopia, Tamirat Layne, the Foreign Minister, Seyoum Mesfin, the presidents of the Tigray and Harari Regional states and representatives from Amhara and the Southern Nations, Nationalities, and People's Regions. On 28 May 2007, during the celebration of Ginbot 20 (celebrating the downfall of the Derg), Jijiga and Degehabur were the scenes of attacks on civilians and government officials. At least 16 people were killed and 67 injured, including Abdulahi Hassan Mohammed, president of the Somali Region, who was speaking at the ceremony. The Ethiopian government blamed the attack on the Ogaden National Liberation Front.

On 29 May 2008, following a heavy downpour the Jijiga River broke its banks and flooded several kebeles in the town and the vicinity. The flooding killed 29 people and displaced 350 households. On 27 September of that year, a bomb exploded outside a hotel in Jijiga killing four and wounding 20. Local police apprehended a suspect whom they claimed was a member of Al-Itihaad al-Islamiya.

Demographics
Based on figures from the Central Statistical Agency in 2007, the town of Jijiga had a total population of 125,876 of whom 67,128 were male and 58,748 were female. The results of the 1994 census in the Somali Region were not satisfactory, so the census was repeated in 1997. This census reported this town had a total population of 65,795 of whom 33,266 were male and 32,529 female. Religion structure in the city of Jijiga is predominantly Muslim. As of 1997, the ethnic composition of the town was 61.58% Somali, 23.25% Amhara, 7.32% Oromo and 4.37% Gurage, and 1.48% Tigrayan; all other ethnic groups made up 1.99% of the population. This city is the largest in the whole Somali region. Jijgija's demographics is made up of Jidwaaq, Akisho,Ogaden,Geri Koombe,
 Garhajis and Habr Awal of the Isaaq, and some other clans like the Gadabursi and Sheekhaal. Overall Jijiga is a diverse city and its very peaceful.

Climate
The climate of Jijiga is a subtropical highland climate (Köppen climate classification: Cwb). extremely wet and lush during rainy season, as with the rest of the Ethiopian highlands, Seasonal differences relate only to rainfall, as temperatures year-round are cool to mild in the mornings and uniformly very warm though not hot during the afternoons.

There are two rainy seasons: the main meher rains occur from July to September, and the short belg rains in April and June. The dry season, known as bega, is cooler by morning than the wet seasons due to lower cloud cover, but equally hot by afternoon though less humid.

Ecology
The vegetation is a grassland from the east and south of the city towards wajaale, with Pockets of juipars and gum forest in higher altitudes in the northern and western part of the city, there is extensive history of animal life in the past. For example, the area was earlier a habitat for the African wild dog, Lycaon pictus, although this canid is likely extirpated at present in the local area, due to an expanding human population.

In his memoirs of his homeland, Nega Mezlekia describes Jijiga as sitting "on the edge of a vast, unmitigated valley on the bottom of Mount Kramanda the beginning of the mighty Ethiopian highlands, with vast lush greenery in sight, rolling hills and plains dotted with many farms in all directions the soaring Eastern Ethiopian Highlands slowing climbing west, the very common tall grassland tree used as shelter by the wandering hyena, and the inevitable sacred tree in every compound, trees in this area of the Somali region reach great heights with the help of generous rainfall year-round, the native Somalis in the area would use this area as a dry season grazing land for all the noble tribes of the land. The city is surrounded by rocky tall green mountains on all sides save the north all the way past nearby Harar all the way to Addis, which is open as far as the eye can see."

Notes

External links

 Cities of Ethiopia: Jijiga by John Graham (Addis Tribune, 28 December 2001)

Populated places in the Somali Region
Ethiopia
Cities and towns in Ethiopia